No Trains No Planes  is a 1999 Dutch drama film directed by Jos Stelling.

Cast
Dirk van Dijck	as 	Gerard
Kees Prins	as	Jacques
Peer Mascini	as 	Benny
Petra Sedda	as	Balie-juffrouw
Leny Breederveld	as 	Coby
Aat Ceelen	as	Ton
Ellen Ten Damme	as 	Paula
Henri Garcin	as	Joop
Piet Brouwer	as 	Verschuren
Jan de Koning	as	Oude man
Jacques Bosman	as	Co
Raymonde de Kuyper	as	Wilma
Thea Breederveld	as	Guurtje
Katja Schuurman	as 	Rietje

External links 
 

Dutch drama films
1999 films
1990s Dutch-language films
Films directed by Jos Stelling
Films scored by Nicola Piovani